Șușani is a commune located in Vâlcea County, Oltenia, Romania. It is composed of five villages: Râmești, Sârbi, Stoiculești, Șușani and Ușurei.

Natives
 Adela Popescu

References

Communes in Vâlcea County
Localities in Oltenia